These are the team rosters of the 16 teams competing in the 2009 FIBA Asia Championship.

Group A

Head coach: Osamu Kuraishi

Head coach: Hur Jae

Head coach: Yeng Guiao

Head coach: Ajit Kuruppu

Group B

Head coach:  Chung Kwang-Suk

Head coach:  Veselin Matić

Head coach:  Zoran Krečković

Head coach: Oleg Levin

Group C

Head coach: Guo Shiqiang

Head coach:  Aleksandar Bućan

Head coach: Vitaliy Strebkov

Head coach: Ali Fakhroo

Group D

Head coach: Ronald Simanjuntak

Head coach:  Mário Palma

Head coach:  Dragan Raca

Head coach:  Mounir Ben Slimane

References 
 FIBA Asia Championship 2009 website

Squad
2009